is a Japanese manga series written and illustrated by Makoto Morishita. It was serialized in Square Enix's Monthly Shōnen Gangan from January 2015 to August 2018 and published in eleven volumes.

Publication
Written and illustrated by Makoto Morishita, the series originated as a one-shot, before beginning serialization as a full series in Square Enix's Monthly Shōnen Gangan on January 10, 2015. The series completed its serialization on August 10, 2018. The series' individual chapters were collected into 11 tankōbon volumes.

In June 2017, Yen Press announced that they licensed the series for English publication digitally. A print release was announced at Anime Expo 2019. The manga is also licensed by Elex Media Komputindo in Indonesia.

Volume list

Reception
Rebecca Silverman of Anime News Network praised the use of mythology and genre stereotypes, though she felt the story dragged in the middle. Leroy Douresseaux of Comic Book Bin praised the action scenes and some of the characters, though he felt some of the characters were also underutilized.

In AnimeJapan 2019's , the series ranked first.

References

External links
 

Action anime and manga
Egyptian mythology in anime and manga
Gangan Comics manga
Shōnen manga
Supernatural anime and manga
Yen Press titles